This is an annotated list of the orchids found in Ireland.

Genus Anacamptis Rich. 
Anacamptis morio (Linnaeus) R.M.Bateman, Pridgeon & M.W.Chase.

Distribution. Southern half of Ireland but not Southwest Map Status. Endangered.

EOL images of Anacamptis morio
Anacamptis pyramidalis (Linnaeus) Richard.

Distribution. Most of Ireland.Map  

EOL images of Anacamptis pyramidalis

Genus Cephalanthera L.C.M. Richard 
Cephalanthera longifolia (Linnaeus) Fritsch.

Distribution.Scattered over Ireland. Extinct Northern Ireland Map Status.Endangered.

EOL images of Cephalanthera longifolia

Genus Coeloglossum Hartm.
valid combination Dactylorhiza viridis

Genus Dactylorhiza Necker ex Nevski

 Dactylorhiza fuchsii (Druce) Soó.

Distribution. All of Ireland Map

EOL images of Dactylorhiza fuchsii
Dactylorhiza fuchsii subspecies hebridensis (Wilmott) Soó
Dactylorhiza fuchsii subspecies fuchsii (Druce) Soó
Dactylorhiza fuchsii subspecies okellyi (Druce) Soó
Dactylorhiza incarnata (Linnaeus) Soó.

Distribution.All of Ireland Map

Dactylorhiza incarnata subspecies cruenta (O.F. Müller) Soó See Kew World Checklist

Distribution Map

EOL images of Dactylorhiza incarnata
Dactylorhiza incarnata subspecies coccinea (Pugsley) Soó
Dactylorhiza incarnata subspecies incarnata (Linnaeus)

Dactylorhiza incarnata subspecies pulchella (Druce) Soó
Dactylorhiza maculata auctorum hibernicorum.

Distribution. All of Ireland Map

EOL images of Dactylorhiza maculata
 Dactylorhiza majalis (Reichenb.) Hunt & Summerhayes.

Distribution. Widespread Map 

EOL images of Dactylorhiza majalis
Dactylorhiza majalis subspecies occidentalis (Pugsley) P. Delforge Synonym of Dactylorhiza kerryensis (Wilmott) P.F. Hunt & Summerhayes. See Kew World Checklist and 

Distribution. Western, Northern and Central Ireland Map

Dactylorhiza purpurella (T. Stephenson & T.A. Stephenson) Soó

Distribution. All Ireland. Mainly North Map

EOL images of Dactylorhiza purpurella
Dactylorhiza traunsteineri (Sauter) Soó. Distribution. All Ireland.Scattered.Map

EOL images of Dactylorhiza traunsteineri
Dactylorhiza viridis (Linnaeus) R.M.Bateman, Pridgeon & M.W.Chase synonym Coeloglossum viride (Linnaeus) Hartman.

Distribution. All Ireland.Map

EOL images of Dactylorhiza viridis

nothosubspecies of = Dactylorhiza (hybrid subspecies)

x braunii (Halácsy) Borsos & Soó
x claudiopolitana (Soó) Soó
x formosa (T. & T.A. Stephenson) Soó
x jenensis (Brand.) Soó
x kellerana P.F. Hunt
x kernerorum (Soó) Soó
x townsendiana (Rouy) Soó
x transiens (Druce) Soó
x venusta (T. & T.A. Stephenson) Soó
Dactylorhiza fuchsii x incarnata subsp. cruenta

Genus Epipactis Zinn
Epipactis atrorubens (Hoffm.) Besser.

Distribution. Western Ireland. Map

EOL images of Epipactis atrorubens
Epipactis helleborine (Linnaeus) Crantz.

Distribution. All Ireland. Map

EOL images of Epipactis helleborine
Epipactis palustris (Linnaeus) Crantz.

Distribution. All Ireland. Map

EOL images of Epipactis palustris 
Epipactis phyllanthes G.E. Smith.

Distribution.Confined to North and coastal East Map

EOL images of Epipactis phyllanthes

Genus Gymnadenia R. Brown
 Gymnadenia borealis (Druce) R.M.Bateman, Pridgeon & M.W.Chase.

Distribution. Restricted. Map

 Gymnadenia conopsea (Linnaeus) R. Brown.

Distribution.All Ireland Map

EOL images of Gymnadenia conopsea
 Gymnadenia densiflora (Wahlenb.) A. Dietr. = Gymnadenia × densiflora (Wahlenb.) A.Dietr., Allg. Gartenzeitung 7: 170 (1839) only this hybrid name is accepted. Hybrid Formula: G. conopsea × G. odoratissima

Distribution. Restricted. North map

nothosubspecies of Gymnadenia (hybrid subspecies)

 x Dactylogymnadenia cookei (H. Harrison fil.) Soó
x Dactylogymnadenia legrandiana (Camus) Soó
x Dactylogymnadenia varia (T. & T.A. Stephenson) Soó

Genus Hammarbya O. Kuntze 
Hammarbya paludosa (Linnaeus) Kuntze.

Distribution.All Ireland.Coastal Map Status.Endangered.

EOL images of Hammarbya paludosa

Genus Leucorchis E. Mey
valid combination Pseudorchis albida (Linnaeus) A. Löve & D. Löve. See below

Genus Listera R. Brown
Valid combination Neottia cordata (L.) Rich. 
Valid combination Neottia ovata (Linnaeus) Bluff & Fingerh.

Genus Neotinea Reichb. f.
 Neotinea maculata (Desfontaines) W.L. Stearn

Distribution. WesternIreland (24 Hectads) Map

EOL images of Neotinea maculata

Genus Neottia Ludwig
 Neottia cordata (L.) Rich.

Distribution. All Ireland. Fewer records Midland Map

EOL images of Neottia cordata
 Neottia ovata (Linnaeus) Bluff & Fingerh.

Distribution. All Ireland.Map

EOL images of Neottia ovata
 Neottia nidus-avis (Linnaeus) L.C.M.Richard

Distribution.All Ireland. Map

EOL images of Neottia nidus-avis

Genus Ophrys Linnaeus 
 Ophrys apifera Hudson

Distribution.All Ireland. Map

EOL images of Ophrys apifera
 Ophrys insectifera Linnaeus

Distribution.Central and West Ireland (karst). Map

EOL images of Ophrys insectifera

Genus Orchis 
Orchis mascula Linnaeus

Distribution.All Ireland. Map

EOL images of Orchis mascula

Genus Platanthera L.C.M. Richard 
 Platanthera bifolia (Linnaeus) L.C.M. Richard

Distribution.All Ireland. Map

EOL images of Platanthera bifolia
 Platanthera chlorantha (Custer) Reichenb.

Distribution.All Ireland. Map

EOL images of Platanthera chlorantha

Genus Pseudorchis Séguier 
Pseudorchis albida (Linnaeus) A. Löve & D. Löve

Distribution.All Ireland. Map Status.Endangered

EOL images of Pseudorchis albida

Genus Spiranthes Rich.
 Spiranthes spiralis (Linnaeus) Chevall.

Distribution. South Ireland. Map

EOL images of Spiranthes spiralis
 Spiranthes romanzoffiana Cham.

Distribution.North, Galway Mayo Buttress and Southwest Map Status. Endangered.

EOL images of Spiranthes romanzoffiana

Synonyms

See WCSP 2012. World Checklist of selected plant families. The Board of Trustees of the Royal Botanic Gardens, Kew. Published on the internet. Accessed: 2012-October-24.

See also
National Biodiversity Network Maps and data

References 

Bateman, R.M., Pridgeon, A.M. & Chase, M.W. (1997). Phylogenetics of subtribe Orchidinae (Orchidoideae, Orchidaceae) based on nuclear its sequences. 2. Infrageneric relationships and reclassification to achieve monophyly of Orchis sensu stricto. Lindleyana 12: 113-141.
Bateman, Richard M, 2011 Glacial progress: do we finally understand thenarrow-leaved marsh-orchids? New Journal of Botany Volume 1, Number 1, June 2011, pp. 2–15(14) pdf
O'Reilly, P. & Parker, S. (2007). The first nature guide to wild orchids in the Burren. pp. [1]-67. Lladdysul: First Nature.
 Scannell, M.J.P. & Synnott, D.M. (1987). Census catalogue of the flora of Ireland. A list of Pteridophyta, Gymnospermae and Angiospermae including all the native plants and established aliens known to occur in Ireland with the distribution of each species, and recommended Irish and English names. pp. [i]-xxvii, 1-171, Map. Dublin: Stationery Office.
Sayers, B. & Sex, S. (2008). Ireland's wild orchids a field guide. pp. [i-iii], i-x, 1-109. Galway: Propeller.
Kingston, N.. (2009). Checklist of protected & rare species in Ireland. pp. 1–15.
Turner Ettlinger, D.M. (1976). British and Irish orchids a field guide. pp. [i]-vi, 1-141. London & Basignstoke: The Macmillan Press Ltd. 
Webb, D.A. & Scannell, M.J.P. (1983). Flora of Connemara and the Burren. pp. i-xlv, 1-322, 4 colour pls; 25 black and white illustrations. Dublin & Cambridge: Royal Dublin Society & Cambridge University Press.
Harrap, Anne & Simon Harrap (2009) Orchids of Britain & Ireland: A Field and Site Guide, 2nd ed., A & C Black, London. .
Lang, David (1980) Orchids of Britain: a field guide. Oxford University Press 
Pierre Delforge, 2006 Orchids of Europe, North Africa and the Middle East 	Portland, Or. : Timber Press 3rd Edition 
Karl-Peter Buttler, 1986 Orchideen, die wildwachsenden Arten Europas. Mosaik Verlag 
H. Baumann, S. Künkele, 1982 Die wildwachsenden Orchideen Europas. Frankh 
Robert L. Dressler,1996 Die Orchideen - Biologie und Systematik der Orchidaceae.
Hans Sundermann, 1975 Europäische und mediterrane Orchideen. Brücke-Verlag, 2. Auflage 
J. G. Williams, Orchideen Europas mit Nordafrika und Kleinasien. BLV Verlag, 
Kreutz, C.A.J., 2004 Kompendium der Europäischen Orchideen Landgraaf Kreutz  Lists all subspecies, forma and other names.
Preston C. D., Pearman D. A. and Dines T.D., 2002 New Atlas of the British & Irish Flora Oxford University Press  Verified and standardised maps.

External links 
 Biodiversity Ireland includes datasets and maps
  http://www.wildflowersofireland.net/groups.php
 Online Atlas of the British and Irish flora Biological Records Centre Information organised under :- Photos, Maps, Habitats, Life Form, Distribution, Conservation Status, Other Accounts, References.
 Orchids of France Pierre Delforge, 2000 .

 
Ireland